The 19571/19572 Rajkot–Porbandar Express is an Express train belonging to Western Railway zone that runs between  and  in India. It is currently being operated with 19571/19572 train numbers on a daily basis.

Coach composition

The train has standard ICF rakes with max speed of 110 kmph. The train consists of 10 coaches:

 8 General Unreserved
 2 Seating cum Luggage Rake

Service

 19571/Rajkot–Porbandar Express has an average speed of 45 km/hr and covers 202 km in 4 hrs 30 mins.
 19572/Porbandar–Rajkot Express has an average speed of 48 km/hr and covers 202 km in 4 hrs 10 mins.

Route and halts 

The important halts of the train are:

Schedule

Traction

Both trains are hauled by a Ratlam Loco Shed-based WDM-3A diesel locomotive from Rajkot to Porbandar and vice versa.

See also 

 Porbandar railway station
 Rajkot Junction railway station
 Rajkot–Porbandar Fast Passenger

References

External links 

 19571/Rajkot–Porbandar Express India Rail Info
 19572/Porbandar–Rajkot Express India Rail Info

Transport in Rajkot
Transport in Porbandar
Express trains in India
Rail transport in Gujarat
Railway services introduced in 2011